Souls Triumphant is a 1917 American drama film directed by  John B. O'Brien and starring Lillian Gish. This is considered to be a lost film.

Cast
 Lillian Gish as Lillian Vale
 Wilfred Lucas as Robert Powers
 Spottiswoode Aitken as Josiah Vale
 Louise Hamilton as Hattie Lee
 Kate Bruce
 Jennie Lee

See also
 Lillian Gish filmography

References

External links

1917 films
1917 drama films
American silent feature films
American black-and-white films
Silent American drama films
Lost American films
1917 lost films
Lost drama films
Films directed by John B. O'Brien
1910s American films